Aleah Goodman (born Novemenber 24, 1998) is an American basketball player. She played college basketball for Oregon State from 2017 to 2021 before briefly playing professionally for the Connecticut Sun in the WNBA. She currently is the Director of Recruiting and Player Development for the Duke Blue Devils women's basketball.

Early life and College 
Goodman attended La Salle College Prep in Oregon. She was a 2-Time 5A State Champion, as well as a 3-Time Oregon 5A Player of the Year. She ended her high school career with over 1,400 points, 750 assists, 550 rebounds and 375 steals. She was named a 2017 McDonalds All-American participant. She played college basketball at Oregon State. During her senior season, she became the 24th player in program history to pass 1,000 career points. She departed the school as its career leader in three-point shooting percentage and third in made three-pointers. She was also No. 15 in program history with 1,162 career points.

Professional career
Goodman was the 30th pick in the 2021 WNBA draft by the Connecticut Sun. The Sun cut her in training camp in May the same year. She re-joined the team 2 days later as a hardship roster addition. Goodman was released from her hardship contract on May 17 after appearing in one game.

In July 2021, she was hired as the director of recruiting and player personnel for Duke Blue Devils women's basketball.

Career statistics

WNBA
Source

|-
| style="text-align:left;"| 2021
| style="text-align:left;"| Connecticut
| 1 || 0 || 3.0 || – || – || – || .0 || 1.0 || .0 || .0 || .0 || .0

References

External links
OSU Beavers Bio

1998 births
Living people
American women's basketball players
Basketball players from Oregon
Connecticut Sun draft picks
Connecticut Sun players
Oregon State Beavers women's basketball players
People from Milwaukie, Oregon
21st-century American women